Horrie White (20 May 1892 – 17 August 1959) was a former Australian rules footballer who played with Carlton in the Victorian Football League (VFL).

Notes

External links 
		
Horrie White's profile at Blueseum

1892 births
1959 deaths
Australian rules footballers from Victoria (Australia)
Carlton Football Club players